Abe Newborn (February 7, 1920 - August 12, 1997) was an American talent agent and theatre producer.

Early life
Newborn was born on February 7, 1920.

Career
Newborn co-founded the Baum-Newborn Agency with Martin Baum in 1948. He represented Robert Alda, Vivian Blaine, Jose Ferrer, Hume Cronyn, Joel Grey, Tony Roberts and Betty Buckley, Cy Coleman, Meredith Willson, Dorothy Fields and Martin Charnin.

Personal life and death
With his wife Joyce, Newborn had a son and a daughter. They resided in Manhattan.

Newborn died on August 12, 1997.

References

1920 births
1997 deaths
People from Manhattan
American talent agents
American theatre managers and producers
Place of birth missing